The World Junior Alpine Skiing Championships 2005 were the 24th World Junior Alpine Skiing Championships, held between 23–27 February 2005 in Bardonecchia, Italy.

Medal winners

Men's events

Two silver medals were awarded in the Super-G.

Women's events

External links
World Junior Alpine Skiing Championships 2005 results at fis-ski.com

World Junior Alpine Skiing Championships
2005 in alpine skiing
Alpine skiing competitions in Italy
2005 in Italian sport
Bardonecchia